Oiketicus is a genus of moths of the family Psychidae.

Species
Oiketicus abbotii Grote, 1880 - Abbot's bagworm moth
Oiketicus herrichii (Westwood, 1855)
Oiketicus kirbyi Guilding, 1827
Oiketicus toumeyi F. M. Jones, 1922
Oiketicus townsendi Townsend, 1894

External links

Psychidae
Psychidae genera